Elliot the Littlest Reindeer is a 2018 Canadian computer-animated Christmas film written and directed by Jennifer Wescott and featuring the voices of Josh Hutcherson, Samantha Bee, Martin Short, Morena Baccarin, Jeff Dunham and John Cleese.

Voice cast
Josh Hutcherson as Elliot, a pony
Samantha Bee as Hazel, a red goat
Martin Short as Lemondrop/Ludzinka/Blitzen
Morena Baccarin as Corkie
Jeff Dunham as Clyde/Peanutbutter
John Cleese as Donner
George Buza as Santa Claus
Angela Fusco as Mrs. Claus
Robert Tinkler as Walter/Russian Coach
Julie Lemieux as Olga/Computer Translator/Swedish Coach/Reindeer 1/Moshennika/Blueberry
Christopher Jacot as DJ/Ignacio/Kitchen Elf
Carly Heffernan as Sasha/Reindeer 4

Reception
Nell Minow of RogerEbert.com awarded the film one and a half out of five stars. Tara McNamara of Common Sense Media awarded the film two stars out of five.

References

External links
 
 

2018 computer-animated films
Canadian animated feature films
Canadian Christmas films
2010s English-language films
2010s Canadian films
Santa Claus in film